Leroy Cooper may refer to:

 Leroy Gordon Cooper, Jr. (1927–2004), American aerospace engineer, pilot and astronaut
 Leroy Cooper (musician) (1928–2009), American jazz and R&B saxophonist